Admiral Williams  may refer to:

United Kingdom
Charles Williams (Royal Navy officer) (1925–2015), British Royal Navy rear admiral
David Williams (Royal Navy officer) (1921–2012), British Royal Navy admiral
Hugh Pigot Williams (1858–1934), British Royal Navy vice admiral
Simon Williams (Royal Navy officer) (fl. 1970s–2020s), British Royal Navy rear admiral
Thomas Williams (Royal Navy officer) (1761/1762–1841), British Royal Navy admiral

United States
Clarence Stewart Williams (1863–1951),  U.S. Navy admiral; commander in chief of the U.S. Asiatic Fleet 1925–1927
Duvall Williams (born 1943), U.S. Navy rear admiral
George Washington Williams (naval officer) (1869–1925), U.S. Navy rear admiral
J. D. Williams (admiral) (born 1935), U.S. Navy vice admiral
John G. Williams Jr. (1924–1991), U.S. Navy admiral
Melvin Williams (admiral) (born 1955), U.S. Navy vice admiral
R. C. Williams (1888–1984), U.S. Public Health Service rear admiral

See also
William Peere Williams-Freeman (1742–1832), British Royal Navy admiral